Southern Nights may refer to:

Southern Nights (Glen Campbell album), a 1977 album by Glen Campbell
"Southern Nights" (song), a single from this album
Southern Nights (Allen Toussaint album), a 1975 album by Allen Toussaint
 Southern Nights (film), a 1953 West German musical film